The Cyrus Bates House (also known as Oliver Bates House and the T. O. Whitney House) is a historic house located at 7185 NY 3 in Henderson, Jefferson County, New York.

Description and history 
The Federal style, single-family house was built in about 1820, and is situated on a 2.9 acre (1.2 ha) plot of land.

It was listed on the National Register of Historic Places on July 14, 2004.

References

Houses on the National Register of Historic Places in New York (state)
Federal architecture in New York (state)
Houses completed in 1820
Houses in Jefferson County, New York
National Register of Historic Places in Jefferson County, New York